Satyajeet Puri (Hindi: सत्यजीत पूरी; born 25 September 1960) is an Indian actor working in the Hindi film industry. He started his career as a child artist with Satyen Bose-directed Mere Lal, released in 1966.

Personal life

Satyajeet Puri, son of actor-director Daljeet Puri graduated from Mithibai College. He is married to a Sindhi lady, Rita, and the couple has two children. His younger sister is married to actor-director Puneet Issar.

Career
Satyajeet, a popular child star in the 70s, has been a part of some wonderful films. His debut film is Mere Lal released in 1966. Some of his earlier films are Wapas (1969) and Khilona (1970). Some of his famous works include Anuraag (1972), Hari Darshan (1972), Bidaai (1974), Paheli (1977), etc. As an adult he worked in Arjun''' (1985), Khoon Bhari Maang (1988), Shola Aur Shabnam (1992), Dulaara (1994), Zameer'' (1997), etc.

He is credited as Master Satyajeet, Master Satyajit, Satyajeet Puri, Satyajit Puri, Satyajeet or Satyajit in cast credits of his movies.

Satyajeet is making a film on life of Indian hockey legend Major Dhyan Chand. Shahrukh Khan is likely to be cast as Dhyan chand.

Filmography
 Mere Lal (1966) …… Pappu
 Wapas (1969) …… Anil
 Nanak Dukhiya Sub Sansar (1970 film)......as young Kartar Singh
 Khilona (1970) …… Pappu
 Sansar (1971) …… Chandan
 Hare Rama Hare Krishna (1971) …… young Prashant
 Ganga Tera Pani Amrit (1971) …… young Dinesh
 Anuraag (1972) …… Chandan
 Hari Darshan (1972) …… Bhakt Prahlad
 Shor (1972) …… Deepak
 Shaadi Ke Baad (1972) …… Chabiley
 Mere Bhaiya (1972) …… young Subhash
 Narad Leela (1972) …… Bal Narad
 Samadhi (1972) …… young Jaswant
 Joshila (1973) …… Ravi
 Pyar Ka Rishta (1973) ……
 Sabak (1973) …… Subhash
 Jugnu (1973) …… young Ashok
 The Criminals / Hum Sab Chor Hain (1973) …… Raju
 Balak Dhruv (1974) …… Bhakt Dhruv
 Dastan-E-Laila Majnu (1974) …… young Kais
 Bidaai (1974) …… Krishna
 Har Har Mahadev (1974) …… Bal Ganesh
 Jai Radhe Krishna (1974) …… Shri Krishna
 Ishk Ishk Ishk (1974) …… Gambhir
 Dharam Karam (1975) …… young Dharam
 Maya Machhindra (1975) …… Gorakhnath
 Rakshaa Bandhan (1976) …… Naag Bhai
 Chacha Bhatija (1977) …… young Shankar
 Jagriti (1977) ……
 Tyaag (1977) …… teenage Pappu
 Paheli (1977) …… Montu
 Gopal Krishna (1979) …… Balraam
 Ayaash (1982) …… Naresh
 Raja Jogi (1983) ……
 Arjun (1985) …… Mohan
 Anadi Khiladi (1986) …… Vikram
 Dacait (1987) …… Ahmed
 Kaun Jeeta Kaun Haara (1987) …… Rajesh
 Khoon Bhari Maang (1988) …… Baliya
 Hathyar (1989) …… Pakya
 Tridev (1989) …… Inspector Tripathi
 Fateh (1991) …… Ranvir
 Shola Aur Shabnam (1992) …… Satya
 Ghazab Tamasha (1992) …… Dev
 Police Officer (1992) …… Inspector Yadav
 Jaagruti (1992) …… Adivasi (Tribal Man)
 Dulaara (1994) …… Deepak
 Hanste Khelte (1994) …… Amit
 Fauj (1994) …… Nagesh
 Zameer (1997) …… Satyakam
 Ghayal Once Again (2016) …… Ajay's Friend

Regional filmography

See also

List of Indian film actors

References

External links
 
 Satyajeet Fan Page on Facebook

1960 births
Living people
20th-century Indian male actors
Male actors in Hindi cinema
Male actors from Mumbai
University of Mumbai alumni
Indian male child actors
21st-century Indian male actors